Bongram is a village in Gopalganj District, Bangladesh, part of Muksudpur Upazila. The village covers an area of 4 km2, and is bordered by the villages of Jalirpar, Barovatra and others two.

Bongram under Jalirpar Union parishad was established in 1840. The village consists of three wards and few mahallas. The village has a primary school, Eight Temples, and few community schools. Famous Kaligangar Mela (Kaliganga Fair) held in this village.

Non-governmental organizations operating in Banagram include BDAO (the Bangladesh Development Acceleration Organisation), BRAC, CCDB, ASA, World Vision, and HCCB.

Populated places in Dhaka Division